Miss Europe 1960 was the 23rd edition of the Miss Europe pageant and the 12th edition under the Mondial Events Organization. It was held at the Casino du Liban in Beirut, Lebanon on June 11, 1960. Anna Ranalli of Italy, was crowned Miss Europe 1960 by out going titleholder Christl Spazier of Austria.

Results

Placements

Contestants 

 - Luise Kammermeier
 - Diane Hidalgo
 - Tina Annelise Pedersen
 - Joan Ellinor Boardman
 - Marja-Leena (Maija-Leena) Manninen
 - Brigitte Barazer de Lannurien
 - Rita Simon
 - Tzeni Loukea
 - Ansje "Ans" Schoon
 - Edda Jónsdóttir
 - Anna Ranalli
 - UNKNOWN
 - Ragnhild Aass Loven
 - Elena Herrera Dávila-Núñez
 - Monica Abrahamsson
 - Éliane Maurath
 - UNKNOWN

Notes

Returns

References

External links 
 

Miss Europe
1960 beauty pageants
1960 in Lebanon